Stanisław Gzil (born 6 May 1949) is a Polish football striker and later manager.

References

1949 births
Living people
Polish footballers
GKS Katowice players
Gwardia Warsaw players
Górnik Zabrze players
K. Beerschot V.A.C. players
K. Berchem Sport players
K.V.C. Westerlo players
Ekstraklasa players
I liga players
Belgian Pro League players
Challenger Pro League players
Poland international footballers
Association football forwards
Polish expatriate footballers
Expatriate footballers in Belgium
Polish expatriate sportspeople in Belgium
Polish expatriate football managers
Expatriate football managers in Belgium
Polish football managers
Amica Wronki managers
K.S.K. Beveren managers